Theta is a genus of sea snails, marine gastropod mollusks in the family Raphitomidae.

Species
Species within the genus Theta include:
 Theta baiocchii Nappo & Pellegrini, 2021
 Theta chariessa (Watson, 1881)
 Theta lyronuclea (Clarke A.H., 1959)
 Theta microcostellata Criscione, Hallan, Puillandre & Fedosov, 2021
 Theta polita Criscione, Hallan, Puillandre & Fedosov, 2021
 Theta spicea (Watson, 1881)
 Theta vayssierei (Dautzenberg, 1925)
Species brought into synonymy
 Theta chrysoplex (Barnard, 1963): synonym of Gymnobela chrysopelex (Barnard, 1963)
 Theta lanceata (Dall, 1927): synonym of Gymnobela lanceata Dall, 1927
Synonyms
 Theta lanceata (Dall, 1927) : synonym of Gymnobela lanceata Dall, 1927

References

 Clarke, A. H. (1959). New abyssal molluscs from off Bermuda collected by the Lamont Geological Observatory. Proceedings of the Malacological Society of London. 33(5): 231–238, pl. 13
 Bouchet, P. & Warén, A. (1980). Revision of the North-East Atlantic bathyal and abyssal Turridae (Mollusca: Gastropoda). Journal of Molluscan Studies. Suppl. 8: 1-119
 Spencer, H.; Marshall. B. (2009). All Mollusca except Opisthobranchia. In: Gordon, D. (Ed.) (2009). New Zealand Inventory of Biodiversity. Volume One: Kingdom Animalia. 584 pp
 Vaught, K.C. (1989). A classification of the living Mollusca. American Malacologists: Melbourne, FL (USA). . XII, 195 pp
 Bouchet P., Kantor Yu.I., Sysoev A. & Puillandre N. (2011) A new operational classification of the Conoidea. Journal of Molluscan Studies 77: 273-308.

External links
 
 Worldwide Mollusc Species Data Base: Raphitomidae
 Criscione, F.; Hallan, A.; Fedosov, A.; Puillandre, N. (2021). Deep Downunder: Integrative taxonomy of Austrobela, Spergo, Theta and Austrotheta (Gastropoda: Conoidea: Raphitomidae) from the deep sea of Australia. Journal of Zoological Systematics and Evolutionary Research. DOI 10.1111/jzs.12512.

Raphitomidae